Slackia isoflavoniconvertens  is a bacterium from the genus of Slackia which has been isolated from faeces of a human from Nuthetal in Germany. Slackia isoflavoniconvertens can metabolize daidzein and genistein, two compounds in the class of isoflavones.

References

 

Bacteria described in 2009
Actinomycetota